John Voss (born February 21, 1946 – November 12, 2016) was a Canadian professional ice hockey goaltender.

Career
Voss played junior hockey with the Kitchener Rangers of the Ontario Hockey Association and began his professional career in the Eastern Hockey League with the Greensboro Generals for the 1966–67 and 1967–68 seasons.

From 1969 to 1973, Voss played with the Charlotte Checkers of the Eastern Hockey League (EHL), where he was recognized for his outstanding performance during the 1970–71 season by being awarded the George L. Davis Jr. Trophy for posting the league's best goals against average of 1.87, and was named to the EHL Southern Division First All-Star Team.

The John Voss Trophy is awarded annually to the Central Hockey League goaltender with the best goals against average for the season, based on at least 20 games played.

Awards and honours

References

External links

1946 births
2016 deaths
Baltimore Clippers players
Beauce Jaros players
Canadian ice hockey goaltenders
Charlotte Checkers (EHL) players
Fort Worth Wings players
Greensboro Generals (EHL) players
Greensboro Generals (SHL) players
Kitchener Rangers players
Omaha Knights (CHL) players
Ice hockey people from Toronto
Tidewater Wings players
Virginia Wings players
Winston-Salem Thunderbirds players